Somnath Bharadwaj (born 28 October 1964) is an Indian theoretical physicist who works on Theoretical Astrophysics and Cosmology.

Bharadwaj was born in India, studied at the Indian Institute of Technology in Kharagpur, and later received his PhD from the Indian Institute of Science. After having worked at the Harish-Chandra Research Institute, he is now a professor at IIT Kharagpur. He has made significant contributions to the dynamics of large-scale structure formation.

In 2003, he was selected to be one of the professors from IIT whose class room lectures would be broadcast in the Eklavya Technology Channel.

Bharadwaj was an invited speakers on Galaxy Formation at the prestigious Indo-US Frontier of Science symposium which was organized by the U.S. National Academy of Sciences in 2005.

He is currently in the editorial board of the Journal of Astrophysics & Astronomy published by the Indian Academy of Sciences.

References

External links
 Somnath Bharadwaj's page at IIT
 Somnath Bharadwaj's articles on INSPIRE-HEP
 NASA ADS database of Somnath Bharadwaj's articles

Academic staff of IIT Kharagpur
Indian astrophysicists
20th-century Indian physicists
Living people
Indian Institute of Science alumni
IIT Kharagpur alumni
1964 births
Scientists from Kolkata